Onogoroshima (Kojiki:  Onogoro-shima; Nihon Shoki:  Onogoro-jima) is an important island in Shinto.

Shinto account
According to the Kojiki, Onogoroshima was created (kuniumi) when the divine couple Izanagi and Izanami churned the sea with the Amenonuhoko (heavenly spear) from their vantage point on the floating bridge of heaven. When they raised the spear from the ocean, drops fell from the spear, forming the island. They built a palace on top with a great column in the middle. The siblings walked around this pillar in opposite directions, and when they encountered each other, they were married. This island is where Hiruko (Ebisu) was born. The island is mentioned only three times in the Kojiki, at ch.3:3, ch:7:25, and ch.111:32.

Real-world placement
In his Kojiki-den, a commentary on the Kojiki, the great Kokugaku scholar Motoori Norinaga asserted that it referred to one of the small islands near Awajishima (e.g. Nushima or Tomogashima). On the island of Nu/ Nushima (Japanese: 沼島), there is a shrine commemorating both Izanagi and Izanami, Onogoro-jinja (Japanese: 自凝神社) on top of a sacred hill revered by all Japanese is where the first island of Japan is created – i.e. Nushima, then followed by other creation of islands.

Folklore of the area surrounding of Onogoro Island 

 Nushima (沼島)
 Nushima is a mysteriously shaped island like a magatama from the sky, located 4.6km above the southern sea of Awaji Island. In 1994, an island where a very rare rock was discovered and is called "Sayagata-shūkyoku (鞘型褶曲, i.e. "Sheath-shaped Fold)", which is regarded as the "Chikyū-no-Shiwa (地球のしわ, i.e. "Wrinkle of the Earth")" is a 100 million years old.
 There are many rocks and reefs on the shoreline of Numashima, and on the southeast coast, a towering giant rock “Kamitategami-Iwa (上立神岩)” with a height of about 30 metres which looks like a spear, has become a reminiscent symbol and icon that became the origin of the "Birth of the Japanese nation" (kamiumi). This rock, which appears as in mythology, is also called "Ame-no-mihashira (天の御柱, "the Pillar of Heaven") and is said to be the one Izanagi and Izanami descended to.

Notes

References
Donald L. Philippi tr. Kojiki, Princeton University Press, Tokyo University Press, 1969
 

Ancient Japan
Locations in Japanese mythology
Mythological islands
Shinto
Islands of Japan